Warsaw railway station may refer to 
 Warsaw station (Indiana), a former railway station in Warsaw, Indiana
 Warszawa Centralna railway station, the main railway station in Warsaw, Poland
 Warszawa Wschodnia railway station, a major passenger station in east Warsaw
 Warszawa Zachodnia station, a railway and long-distance bus station in west Warsaw
 Varshavsky railway station, a former railway station in Saint Petersburg, Russia